Natalia Chigirinova (born 20 July 1993) is a Russian handballer who plays for CSKA Moscow .

International honours
EHF Cup: 
Winner: 2014
Summer Universiade: 
Gold Medalist: 2015

References

1993 births
Living people
Sportspeople from Tolyatti
Russian female handball players
Universiade medalists in handball
Universiade gold medalists for Russia
Medalists at the 2015 Summer Universiade
RK Podravka Koprivnica players